The women's 400 metres hurdles event at the 2013 Summer Universiade was held on 8–9 July.

Medalists

Results

Heats
Qualification: First 2 in each heat and 2 best performers advance to the Finals.

Final

References

External links
 Women's 400m Hurdles at kazan2013.ru

Hurdles
2013 in women's athletics
2013